Chuka Momah  is a Nigerian sport reporter and administrator, he is a former president of the Nigerian Tennis Federation and the Confederation of African Tennis. In 2013, he published Sports Spectacular, a book about sport stories and analysis of sport in Nigeria.

Momah attended Government College, Ibadan and he is a microbiology graduate of University of Nigeria, he was a member of the university's cricket team that won the cricket event at the 1974 NUGA games.

After graduation, Momah worked at a few private firms, retiring in 1985 with Hoechst. He has worked as both a print and broadcast commentator on sports. He was columnist for the National Concord between the years 1982 and 1985 and a contributing editor at Newswatch. He was the anchorman on NTA's Sport Spectacular broadcast on network service and presented Big Fights on of the Decades also on NTA.

References

Living people
Year of birth missing (living people)
Place of birth missing (living people)
Nigerian sports journalists
University of Nigeria alumni
Tennis executives
Nigerian sports executives and administrators